Samuel Fagerholm (born 10 October 1992) is a Finnish football manager and a former footballer, managed Åland United in the Finnish Naisten Liiga, women's premier division, during the seasons of 2018-2020 where the team succeeded to win both the cup and the league during the 2020 season. He is currently managing Umeå IK in Damallsvenskan which he promoted during the 2021 season.  He has played for Sunds IFFK as a defender. He made one appearance in the Finnish top football division (Veikkausliiga) in 2011.

International career
Fagerholm played his first game with the (FIFA neither UEFA affiliated) Åland Islands team on 26 June 2011 against Saaremaa (3–3), in which he played the entire match. So far, he only featured at the 2011 edition of the Island Games.

References

External links
 

1992 births
Living people
Finnish footballers
Association football defenders
IFK Mariehamn players